Wolfgang Lippert (26 September 1937 in Nördlingen-20 June 2018) was a German botanist. His main areas of interest are the Spermatophytes.

References

1937 births
2018 deaths
20th-century German botanists
People from Nördlingen